Википедија may refer to:

 Serbian Wikipedia
Serbo-Croatian Wikipedia
 Macedonian Wikipedia